A Facade is the exterior of a building.

Facade (or the French word façade) may also refer to:
 Facade constitutions
 Façade (entertainment), poems by Edith Sitwell set to music by William Walton
 Façade (ballet), a ballet by Frederick Ashton based on the Sitwell/Walton work, above
 Façade (film), a 2000 movie starring Eric Roberts
 Façade (video game), a 2005 independent experimental video game in the genre of interactive fiction
 Facade pattern, in programming, a structural pattern used alongside an API
 "Façade" (song), by Disturbed on the album Indestructible
 Facades (album), a 1979 album by Sad Café
 Facades, a composition by Philip Glass

See also
 in figurative language, a facade is to behave in ways that are considered socially acceptable, see Masking (personality)
 Fasad, an Islamic term referring to social disorder